ActionShot is a method of capturing an object in action and displaying it in a single image with multiple sequential appearances of the object.

Additional names: action synopsis, motion synopsis, panoramic video synopsis, dynamic still, synopsis mosaic, stromotion.

Background 

There are many methods for capturing panoramic images, some being fully manual or semi-automatic, and others completely automatic. However, the majority of these methods are for creating panoramic photos of a static landscape. In contrast, the capture of a dynamic scene — i.e. recording the motion of a moving object — is typically done by video recording. 

ActionShot is a method that combines elements of both panoramic and video photography to create panoramic photos of dynamic scenes that take place over a wide-angle area. This involves capturing a moving object (e.g. a person running, riding a bicycle or skiing) and depicting multiple instances of this object over a single panoramic background.

Methods

Hardware 

Stroboscopes have been used to create static images of an action. The moving object is illuminated by the periodic light flashes generated by the stroboscope and is shot by a stills camera using a long exposure. This results in a photograph that displays multiple images of the object along its path.

ActionShot photography is now available as part of camera application on Samsung Android Galaxy Premium Devices (Samsung Galaxy S and Samsung Galaxy S2) or by downloading the Nokia Smartcam app on the Microsoft Lumia Phones

Manual image editing 

To create a dynamic panoramic image manually, a photographer needs to take several shots or still frames from a high-resolution video of a moving object and then combine them together using manual image registration, followed by manual image stitching. Image editing programs can assist in this process.

Automatic image processing 

Early digital image processing methods created a "synopsis mosaic" by building a panoramic image a video sequence where higher weights were assigned to the moving objects.
However, good image registration and stitching alone were not sufficient for creating a realistic image, because if the moving object overlaps itself, the combined result seems highly unnatural. 
This in order to create eye-catching synopsis still images, and even videos, the moving objects are required not to overlap in the composed result.

Related methods 
 Action synopsis for computer animation

See also
Panoramic photography
Image stitching
Video synopsis

References

External links 
 ActionShot photos created  by Samsung Omnia2 cellphone.
 ActionShot examples created by the Dartfish commercial software.

Image processing
Panorama photography
Photography by genre